The Iowa Department of Human Services is a state agency of Iowa, headquartered in the Hoover State Office Building in Des Moines.

History 
The Iowa Board of Social Welfare was founded in 1937 by the Iowa General Assembly. In 1967, it was merged with the Iowa Board of Control and Iowa Board of Parole to form the Iowa Department of Social Services. It was renamed the Iowa Department of Human Services in 1987.

Functions 
The agency provides human services, including healthcare services, assistance services, food programs, and disaster relief. The department also allows residents of Iowa to report incidents of fraud or abuse. The department also manages juvenile justice facilities and training schools in the state. The department also operates the Child Support Recovery Unit.

After the 2021 Fall of Kabul and subsequent formation of the Islamic Emirate of Afghanistan, the department was tasked with coordinating resettlement efforts for Afghan refugees.

References

External links

 Iowa Department of Human Services
 "State Juvenile Facilities" (Archive) - May 11, 2007

State agencies of Iowa
Juvenile detention centers in the United States
State corrections departments of the United States